Triethylene glycol dimethyl ether (also called triglyme) is a glycol ether used as a solvent.

See also 
 Monoglyme
 Diglyme
 Tetraglyme

References

Glycol ethers